Remedy Club Tour – Live is a second live album/DVD and eighth overall by American band David Crowder Band. The album was released on August 19, 2008. It was recorded live on the band's club tour across America, which took place after the release of their album Remedy.

Track listing

Chart positions

Awards
In 2009, the album was nominated for a Dove Award for Recorded Music Packaging of the Year at the 40th GMA Dove Awards.

References

External links
 Billboard review of Remedy Club: Tour Edition

David Crowder Band albums
2008 live albums
Sparrow Records live albums
Christian live video albums